Helkavirsiä (Swedish: Helkasånger; English: Whitsongs) is a two-part poetry collection by the Finnish poet Eino Leino, published in 1903 and 1916 respectively. Leino wrote the first part in Kangasniemi, in Central Finland, in the summer of 1903, while staying at the summer house of his friend and fellow writer, Otto Manninen.

The collection draws inspiration from the country's national epic Kalevala and other Finnish mythology, merging legends and ballads with modern themes and structures.

Helkavirsiä is considered not only Leino's breakthrough and one of his most notable works, but also seminal in the development of modern Finnish poetry and wider cultural identity.

References

External links
Helkavirsiä (part I; 1903), digital version online at Digital Collections, National Library of Finland

Finnish poetry collections
1903 poetry books
1916 poetry books
Finnish poetry books
20th-century poetry books